David Kuchejda (born July 12, 1987) is a Czech professional ice hockey right wing who plays for Deggendorfer SC of the Oberliga. He was drafted by the Chicago Blackhawks in the 7th round of the 2005 NHL Entry Draft.

Kuchejda played 210 games in the Czech Extraliga for HC České Budějovice and Rytíři Kladno.

Career statistics

Regular season and playoffs

International

References

External links

1987 births
Living people
EHC Bayreuth players
Chicago Blackhawks draft picks
Czech ice hockey right wingers
ETC Crimmitschau players
Kassel Huskies players
Lausitzer Füchse players
BK Mladá Boleslav players
Motor České Budějovice players
IHC Písek players
Rytíři Kladno players
Sault Ste. Marie Greyhounds players
HC Slovan Ústečtí Lvi players
Sportspeople from Opava
HC Tábor players
Czech expatriate ice hockey players in Germany
Czech expatriate ice hockey players in Canada